Darby Saxbe is a clinical psychologist and professor of psychology at the University of Southern California, who researches stress within the context of relationships.

Research interests
She researches stress within a close relationship context, with a focus on the transition to parenthood as a nexus of neural, hormonal, behavioral and psychological change. She has also studied hormonal linkage within couples and families, finding that partners with more strongly correlated cortisol levels report more relationship distress and that expectant couples may show linked levels of testosterone which in turn predict paternal relationship investment. She has also found that testosterone levels in new fathers are associated with both their own and their partners' postpartum depressive symptoms, and has examined sleep as another mechanism for within-couple transmission of postpartum depression risk.

Education and awards
Saxbe received her BA in English Literature and Psychology from Yale University and her Ph.D. from the University of California, Los Angeles. In 2018, she was awarded an American Psychological Association's Award for Distinguished Scientific Early Career Contributions to Psychology in the field of health psychology. She has also been named an Association for Psychological Science Rising Star, received the Society for Research in Child Development Early Career Award in 2015, the Caryl Rusbult Early Career Award for Relationship Research from the Society for Personality and Social Psychology in 2017, and a Fulbright Program Fellowship to Barcelona, Spain in fall 2019 to study cross-cultural perspectives on the parenting brain.

Teaching
Saxbe directs the USC Center for the Changing Family, a group of affiliated faculty from across the University of Southern California, including faculty from Psychology, Sociology, Economics, Pediatrics, Social Work, Law, and Preventive Medicine who study families from different methodological lenses.

Media and consulting
Her work and writing have been featured in The Conversation, Slate, Fast Company, NPR, the New York Times, and elsewhere. She has consulted on books including Jancee Dunn's How Not to Hate Your Husband After Kids and Eve Rodsky's Fair Play.

References 

21st-century American psychologists
Year of birth missing (living people)
Living people
American women psychologists
University of Southern California faculty
Yale University alumni
University of California, Los Angeles alumni
American women academics
21st-century American women